Elima or Elimä may refer to:

Aphnaeus elima, species of lycaenid or blue butterfly found in Asia
Kurt Elimä (born 1939), Swedish ski jumper who competed from 1963 to 1966
Olivier Elima (born 1983), French rugby league footballer who has played in the 2000s and 2010s
 TC Elima, football club from DR Congo

See also
Elimäki, former municipality of Finland